Banta ng Kahapon is a 1977 Philippine action film directed by Eddie Romero and starring Vic Vargas, Rafael Roco, Jr., Roland Dantes, and Chanda Romero.

Set during the 1969 Philippine House of Representatives elections, it follows the motive of "guns, goons, and gold."

Cast
Vic Vargas
Rafael Roco, Jr.
Roland Dantes
Chanda Romero
Lito Legaspi
John Soberano
Roderick Paulate
Ruben Rustia
Karim Kiram
Romero Rivera
Henry Salcedo
Oliva O'Hara
Celita DeCastro

Reception
The film won the 1978 Gawad Urian Award for "Best Editing" by Ben Barcelon. It was also nominated in those awards for Best Picture, Best Director, and Best Screenplay of 1978. It was an official entry in the 1977 Metro Manila Film Festival.

In 2004, the Philippines government film office lauded the movie as "Another Eddie Romero masterpiece" that closed the annual retrospective of classic films.

When Romero died in 2013, the TV network ABS-CBN cited the film as one of his four most important films.

Accolades

References

External links
 

1977 films
Philippine action films
Tagalog-language films
Films directed by Eddie Romero